Face to Face is the sixth studio album by Irish boy band Westlife and it was released in the UK on 31 October 2005. The album contains pop songs and some dance oriented tracks. It was also the band's second album to be released as a four-piece. It was also the band's seventh album release under RCA Records and Sony BMG.

The album was also released on DualDisc in the UK, which included the videos of the making of "You Raise Me Up", the Face to Face album photoshoot and exclusive interview footage.

The album includes a cover of "She's Back" by Human Nature, "Desperado" by the Eagles, Collin Raye's number one hit "In This Life", and a Nick Carter solo song, "Heart Without a Home".

The album had more than 10,000 legal copies sold in mainland China.

Singles 
The first single released from the album is "You Raise Me Up", which brought the band back into the limelight after their ratpack-tribute ...Allow Us to Be Frank. The second single is a cover version of "When You Tell Me That You Love Me", which is recorded as a duet with the original singer, Diana Ross. The single reached the top 2 of the charts in December 2005, the 2nd time that the single had hit the top 2 of the charts for Diana. The final single released is "Amazing", the original mid-tempo song.

Face to Face Tour 2006 

This tour set a goal that they will play in smaller venues and for smaller audiences to justify the title "Face to Face". The filmed video album for this tour came from their performance at the Wembley Arena. This also had a second leg of the tour 'summer nights' all over the biggest UK outdoor parks, castles and racing grounds.

Commercial performance 
The Face to Face album became Westlife's fifth UK number-one album in seven years, selling 1.3 million in the United Kingdom and becoming #7 and #129 in UK Year-end albums chart for 2005 and 2006 respectively. It was the biggest selling album released by Sony BMG Entertainment in 2005. It is certified 4× Platinum in the UK. It remained at #1 on the Australian ARIA charts for 4 weeks in March 2006 and was the 25th highest selling album of 2006 in Australia.

Track listing 

 "Amazing" is also referred to as "More than Amazing".
 "Heart Without a Home" is also referred to as "Heart Without a Home (I'll Be Yours)".

Credits

Charts

Weekly charts

Year-end charts

Decade-end charts

Certifications

Release history

References

External links 

Official Westlife Website

2005 albums
Westlife albums
Albums produced by Steve Mac
Sony BMG albums
RCA Records albums
Albums produced by David Kreuger
Albums produced by Per Magnusson